Realwheels Theatre is a Canadian disability theatre company based in Vancouver, British Columbia. Realwheels was founded in 2003 by James Sanders and has since received multiple Jessie Richardson Theatre Awards and nominations.

History 
In 2000, James Sanders — an actor who became quadriplegic in 1990 — and Trevor Found created the Realwheels Ad Hoc Collective, which would eventually break out into Realwheels Theatre. They began by producing plays without a disability centred story.

After the success of these productions, Sanders, in 2003, founded and incorporated Realwheels Theatre as a registered non-profit. Sanders has described Realwheels' mandate as being to promote "a deeper understanding of the disability experience." James Sanders held the Artistic Director position until 2014 when Managing Director, Rena Cohen, assumed both roles. In 2021, Realwheels, welcomed Tomas Mureika into the Artistic Director role.

Realwheels' first major production since its founding was Skydive in 2007, which Sanders commissioned from playwright Kevin Kerr and starred in alongside actor Bob Frazer. It won the 2007 CITT/ICTS Award of Technical Merit. In 2010, Realwheels worked with Kerr again, co-producing Spine, a play commissioned by the Vancouver 2010 Cultural Olympiad.

In 2019, Realwheels announced that Kirsten Kirsch would be its inaugural playwright-in-residence, with her residency beginning in 2020. In 2020 and 2021, Realwheels adapted their in-person theatre approach to include virtual community performances. In May 2021 Wheel Voices: Tune In! premiered with a virtual cast.

The Realwheels Acting Academy was established in 2021, inviting its first cohort of students for September 2021. The program is designed for people with disabilities. Supported and created in part by disability community members, the Realwheels Acting Academy aims to increase the direct participation of people with disabilities in the cultural landscape and make systemic change.

Production history

Community productions 
Realwheels community performances include any artist that self identifies as living with disability who wants to be involved.
SuperVoices (2015)
 SexyVoices (2016)
 Comedy on Wheels (2017)
 Wheel Voices: Tune In! (2021)

Professional productions 
Skydive by Kevin Kerr (2007)
 Spine by Kevin Kerr (2011)
 Whose Life is it Anyway? by Brian Clark (2014)
 Re-Calculating by Lucas Foss and Liesl Lafferty (2015)
 Creeps by David E. Freeman (2016)
 Sequence by Arun Lakra (2018)
 Act of Faith by Janet Munsil (2019)
 Teenage Dick by Mike Lew, in collaboration with Bard on the Beach and Arts Club Theatre (2022)
 In Camera translated by Cory Haas from Jean-Paul Sartre's No Exit, live-streamed digital production (2022)

Awards and nominations

References 

2003 establishments in Canada
Theatre companies in British Columbia
Disability theatre
Theatre in Vancouver
Organizations based in Vancouver